= Bassapur =

- Village
- Country: India
- State: Karnataka
- District: Belgaum
- Taluka: Belgaum

Government
  - Type: Panchayat raj

Population (2011)
  - Total: 3,059

Languages
  - Official: Kannada
- Time zone: UTC+5:30 (IST)
- ISO 3166 code: IN-KA

Bassapur is a small village in the Belgaum taluka of Belgaum district in the southern India state of Karnataka. As of the 2011 Indian census, it had a population of 3,059.
